Joseph Anthony Kelly (born 1958) is an English journalist, editor and theologian. He is the editor and publisher of The Official Catholic Directory of England & Wales and managing editor of The Edit Partnership Ltd.

Kelly was born in Perivale, Middlesex on 10 August 1958. He lived in Tadley, Hampshire and Tilehurst, Reading and attended Presentation College, Reading, and later as a mature student read English at Ruskin College, Oxford and gained an MA in Religions and Theology at Manchester University.

Kelly trained as a photographer and worked in a number of south of England studios, before moving to London to work as a freelance photojournalist for the national press.

He moved to north Wales in 1987 to become editor of Country Quest, the magazine for Wales, before moving on to edit New Lines, the Welsh Arts Council literary review, and then worked as deputy editor on the Wrexham Leader, editor of the Deeside Midweek Leader and was music editor on the North Wales Evening Leader.

In 1994 he moved to The Catholic Universe national weekly newspaper as deputy editor, then edited Catholic Life magazine for twelve months, before returning as editor of The Catholic Universe – a position he held for 26 years until the company went into liquidation on 29 June 2021. Kelly was the second longest serving editor in the paper's 160-year history. 

In 2010 Kelly commissioned the National Museum of Wales to create an exact replica of a historic Catholic book secretly produced in a cave in north Wales in 1586 as a gift from the people of Wales for Pope Benedict XVI. This was presented to the Pope at a Mass in Westminster Cathedral during his 2010 UK visit.

In July 2021 Kelly set up The Edit Partnership Ltd,and is editor of The official Catholic Directory of England & Wales and Agora Journal online architecture magazine.

He served for five years on CADW's Historic Buildings Conservation Committee. He is a member of the Royal Photographic Society, the Society of Editors, and is an affiliate member of RIBA.

In November 2022 The Catholic Herald named Kelly as one of their "UK Catholic Leaders of Today 2022".

References 

1958 births
Living people